The Brit Award for British Album of the Year is given annually by the British Phonographic Industry (BPI), which represents record companies and artists in the United Kingdom. The accolade is presented at the Brit Awards, an annual celebration of British and international music. Winners and nominees are determined by the Brit Awards voting academy, which has over one thousand members: record labels, publishers, managers, agents, and media, as well as prior winners and nominees. The award was first presented in 1977 as British Album of the Year. In 1983 and 1984, the award was non-competitive and determined by highest album sales. Album of the Year is generally seen as the Brit Awards' most prestigious honour.

The inaugural recipients of the award were The Beatles in 1977 for Sgt. Pepper's Lonely Hearts Club Band. The first solo artist to win the award competitively was Phil Collins, who won in 1986 for his third studio album No Jacket Required, with Annie Lennox becoming the first solo female artist to win in 1993. Adele, Coldplay and Arctic Monkeys hold the record for most wins in the category, with three, with two-time winners Manic Street Preachers being the only other act to win more than once. Radiohead hold the record for most nominations without a win, with five. The current holder of the award is Harry Styles, who won in 2023 for his album Harry's House.

Achievements
Coldplay (2001, 2003, 2006), Arctic Monkeys (2007, 2008, 2014), and Adele (2012, 2016, 2022) are the biggest winners in this category with three wins. They are followed by Manic Street Preachers (1997, 1999) with two victories. Coldplay has the most nominations, with six. Elton John and Ed Sheeran lead solo performers, each with four nods. Among female artists, Adele leads with three nominations, winning each time she was nominated. Damon Albarn has the most nominations of any individual, with five, owing to his membership of both Blur and Gorillaz.

Arctic Monkeys won in 2007 and 2008 for Whatever People Say I Am, That's What I'm Not and Favourite Worst Nightmare, making them the only consecutive winners. 

In 1983, Barbra Streisand became the first woman to receive the award for Memories, which won as the year's best-selling album. Memories holds a unique distinction as the only compilation rather than a studio album to ever win the award. In 1993, Annie Lennox became the first female solo artist to win the competitive award for Diva. Adele is the first female artist and solo act to win the award multiple times, for 21, 25, and 30.

The youngest artist to win in the category is Dave who was 21 when he won for his debut album Psychodrama, released in 2020.  
 
Only two non-UK artists have received the award: Barbra Streisand in 1983 for Memories and Michael Jackson in 1984 for Thriller, whose win marks the only occasion when no other album was nominated in the category. Both albums are notable as the only non-competitive winners in the award's history.

To date, fourteen artists have won Album of the Year with their debut albums: Sade, Fairground Attraction, Seal, Coldplay, Dido, The Darkness, Keane, Arctic Monkeys, Duffy, Florence and the Machine, Mumford & Sons, Emeli Sandé, Stormzy and Dave. Technically, Annie Lennox also won for her debut solo album, though she had already released eight albums as a member of Eurythmics, including two that were nominated in this category.

Recipients

1970s

1980s

1990s

2000s

2010s

2020s

Artists with multiple wins

Artists with multiple nominations
6 nominations
 Coldplay

5 nominations
 Damon Albarn
 Radiohead

4 nominations

 Florence and the Machine
 Elton John
 Ed Sheeran

3 nominations

 The 1975
 Adele
 Arctic Monkeys
 Blur
 Annie Lennox
 Massive Attack
 George Michael
 Oasis
 Simply Red
 Stormzy

2 nominations

 Lily Allen
 alt-J
 David Bowie
 Kate Bush
 The Coral
 Dave
 Craig David
 Dido
 Dire Straits
 Eurythmics
 George Ezra
 Gomez
 Gorillaz
 J Hus
 Michael Kiwanuka
 Dua Lipa
 Manic Street Preachers
 Mumford & Sons
 Muse
 Pet Shop Boys
 Pink Floyd
 Plan B
 Queen
 Snow Patrol
 Sting
 The Streets
 Harry Styles
 Take That
 Tears for Fears
 Travis
 Robbie Williams

Notes

Notes
 Brothers in Arms (1986–1987), Born to Do It (2001–2002), Kid A (2001–2002) Double Nominated
 (What's the Story) Morning Glory? (2010) also won Brit Award for British Album of Thirty Year

References

Brit Awards
 
Awards established in 1977
Awards established in 1982
Awards disestablished in 1977
Album awards